The list of shipwrecks in 1998 includes ships sunk, foundered, grounded, or otherwise lost during 1998.

January

1 January

3 January

16 January

26 January

30 January

February

15 February

16 February

17 February

22 February

March

23 March

27 March

April

7 April

9 April

16 April

26 April

May

7 May

16 May

18 May

28 May

June

2 June

4 June

9 June

16 June

23 June

25 June

July

9 July

10 July

16 July

19 July

22 July

27 July

28 July

30 July

31 July

August

7 August

8 August

9 August

18 August

19 August

September

2 September

14 September

18 September

20 September

24 September

25 September

October

16 October

19 October

21 October

26 October

27 October

29 October

November

6 November

11 November

December

5 December

15 December

17 December

22 December

26 December

Unknown date

Unknown date

References

1998
 
Ship